Golden tortoise beetle may refer to the leaf beetles:

 Aspidimorpha furcata, native to Asia
 Aspidimorpha sanctaecrucis, native to southeastern Asia
 Charidotella egregia
 Charidotella sexpunctata, native to the Americas

See also
 Ischnocodia annulus